Marlene Kuntz are an Italian rock band formed in Cuneo in 1990. Initially they were inspired by the noise rock of Sonic Youth.

History
Marlene Kuntz began forming in 1987 consisting of Luca Bergia on drums and Riccardo Tesio on guitar. Franco Ballatore joined the band on bass guitar the following year and that winter they found a rehearsal room in Confreria. In 1989, Cristiano Godano joined the band playing guitar and writing songs. Alex Astegiano also came in as the singer. In May they played their first concert in Cuneo playing "1° 2° 3°", "La verità" and "Emozioni Nascoste". In February 1990, they recorded a 4 song demo including "La verità", "Trasudamerica", "1° 2° 3°" and "Capello lungo". In April they also recorded their first video, "Merry X-mas". After the concert on April 25 at Cortemilia, Alex left the band due to working pressure. Cristiano replaced him as a lead singer while continuing playing guitar. In July, the new line-up recorded the second demo with 4 songs: "Donna L", "Gioia che mi do", "Signor Niente" and "Merry X-mas".

In early 1992, the bassist Franco Ballatore left the band. However, he was replaced by Gianluca Viano and Marlene Kuntz came up with their third demo in March, consisting of five songs and a new style. The demo included: "M.K.", "Fuoco" (that became "Fuoco su di te" in  Catartica), "La divina" (a revisited version was renamed "Cenere" in the Il vile), and "Ape Regina". The demo was well received leading to Marlene Kuntz competing at Rock Targato Italia. Marlene Kuntz reached the semi-final but failed to reach one of the first 8 positions. However, one of the competing bands quit the contest and Marlene Kuntz reentered successfully.

Marlene Kuntz released their debut album Catartica in May 1994, followed by Il vile in 1996.

In 2001, Marlene Kuntz was nominated for Best Italian Act at the 2001 MTV Europe Music Awards.

In 2012, they took part to Sanremo Music Festival with the song Canzone per un figlio.

Discography
 Catartica (1994)
 Il vile (1996)
 Come di sdegno (1997) [EP]
 Ho ucciso paranoia (1999)
 Ho ucciso paranoia + Spore (1999)
 H.U.P. Live in Catharsis (1999) [Live]
 Che cosa vedi (2000)
 Cometa (2001) [EP]
 Spore (2001)
 Senza Peso (2003)
 Fingendo la poesia (2004) [EP]
 Bianco sporco (2005)
 S-Low (2006) [Live]
 Uno (2007)
 Best of Marlene Kuntz (2009)
 Cercavamo il silenzio (2009) [CD+DVD Live]
 Ricoveri virtuali e sexy solitudini (2010)
 Canzoni per un figlio (2012)
 Nella tua luce (2013)
 Pansonica (2014) [EP]
 Lunga Attesa (2016)

Videoclip and Singles

 1993 – Fuoco su di te
 1994 – Merry X-Mas
 1994 – Lieve
 1996 – Come stavamo ieri
 1996 – Festa mesta (live)
 1999 – L'odio migliore
 1999 – Infinità
 1999 – Le Putte
 1999 – In delirio
 1999 – Canzone di domani (live)
 1999 – Sonica (live)
 2000 – Canzone di oggi
 2000 – La canzone che scrivo per te
 2000 – Serrande alzate
 2003 – A fior di pelle
 2003 – Notte
 2005 – Poeti
 2005 – Bellezza
 2007 – Musa
 2009 – Impressioni di settembre
 2009 – Canzone in prigione
 2010 – Paolo anima salva
 2011 – Io e me
 2011 – Vivo
 2011 – Un piacere speciale
 2012 – Canzone per un figlio
 2012 – Il partigiano
 2012 – Monnalisa
 2013 – Solstizio
 2013 – Il genio (L'importanza di essere Oscar Wilde)
 2013 – Seduzione
 2014 – Sotto la luna
 2016 – Fecondità
 2016 – Leda

See also
Italian rock

References

External links

Official site of Marlene Kuntz
Marlene Kuntz on MTV.it

Noise rock groups
Italian rock music groups
Italian post-rock groups
Musical groups from Piedmont